Another One (also released as Oscar Pettiford Volume 2) is an album by bassist/cellist and composer Oscar Pettiford which was recorded in 1955 and first issued on the Bethlehem label.

Reception

The Allmusic review by Al Campbell states: "This is not just a bebop date; Pettiford had the range to incorporate influences like Duke Ellington and calypso, creating a full, lyrical band sound that matched his bass playing".

Track listing 
All compositions by Oscar Pettiford except where noted.
 "Another One" (Quincy Jones) - 5:10
 "Minor Seventh Heaven" (Osie Johnson) - 4:11
 "Stardust" (Hoagy Carmichael, Mitchell Parish) - 3:31
 "Bohemia After Dark" - 5:35
 "Oscalypso" - 2:24
 "Scorpio" (Mary Lou Williams) - 3:46
 "Titoro" (Billy Taylor) - 3:21
 "Don't Squawk" - 4:17
 "Kamman's a-Comin'" - 4:12

Personnel 
Oscar Pettiford - bass, cello
Donald Byrd, Ernie Royal - trumpet (tracks 1, 2 & 4-9)
Bob Brookmeyer - valve trombone (tracks 1, 2 & 4-9)
Gigi Gryce - alto saxophone, clarinet (tracks 1, 2 & 4-9)
Jerome Richardson - tenor saxophone, clarinet, flute (tracks 1, 2 & 4-9)
Don Abney - piano
Osie Johnson- drums (tracks 1, 2 & 4-9)

References 

Oscar Pettiford albums
1955 albums
Bethlehem Records albums